CMA CGM Jacques Saadé is a containership operated by the CMA CGM Group. She entered commercial operation on 23 September 2020 and is the first of a class of nine sisterships which at the time of construction were the world’s largest vessels to be powered using liquefied natural gas. She is named after Jacques Saadé the founder of CMA CGM and has a capacity of 23,000 TEU (Twenty-foot Equivalent Unit). In her own category, she is the largest container ship to sail under the French flag.

History 

The CMA CGM Jacques Saadé is the first of a class of nine sisterships to be delivered following a decision taken by Rodolphe Saadé, Chairman and Chief Executive Officer of the CMA CGM Group, to order containerships powered by liquefied natural gas (LNG).

The ship was laid down in July 2018 at the CSSC shipyard in Shanghai, launched on 25 September 2019 and completed in September 2020. She was originally scheduled to be completed in November 2019 but was delayed by 10 months.

She entered commercial operation on 23 September 2020, on the French Asia Line route and is registered at the French International Register (RIF) with a home port of Marseille, where the CMA CGM Group’s head office has been based for over 40 years.

Design 

At the time of construction she was the largest LNG-powered vessel ever built.

See also

Jacques Saadé-class container ship
Hudong-Zhonghua Shipbuilding

References 

Container ships
Jacques Saadé
2019 ships